Sciurinae is a subfamily of squirrels (in the family Sciuridae), uniting the flying squirrels with certain related tree squirrels. Older sources place the flying squirrels in a separate subfamily (Pteromyinae) and unite all remaining sciurids into the subfamily Sciurinae, but this has been strongly refuted by genetic studies.

Classification
Subfamily Sciurinae
Tribe Sciurini
Genus Microsciurus – American dwarf squirrels
Central American dwarf squirrel, M. alfari
Amazon dwarf squirrel, M. flaviventer
Western dwarf squirrel, M. mimulus
Santander dwarf squirrel, M. santanderensis
Genus Rheithrosciurus
Tufted ground squirrel, R. macrotis
Genus Sciurus
Subgenus Sciurus
Allen's squirrel, S. alleni
Arizona gray squirrel, S. arizonensis
Mexican gray squirrel, S. aureogaster
Eastern gray squirrel, S. carolinensis
Collie's squirrel, S. colliaei
Deppe's squirrel, S. deppei
Japanese squirrel, S. lis
Calabrian black squirrel, S. meridionalis
Mexican fox squirrel, S. nayaritensis
Fox squirrel, S. niger
Peters's squirrel, S. oculatus
Variegated squirrel, S. variegatoides
Eurasian red squirrel, S. vulgaris
Yucatan squirrel, S. yucatanensis
Subgenus Otosciurus
Abert's squirrel, S. aberti
Subgenus Guerlinguetus
Brazilian squirrel or Guianan squirrel, S. aestuans
Yellow-throated squirrel, S. gilvigularis
Red-tailed squirrel, S. granatensis
Bolivian squirrel, S. ignitus
Andean squirrel, S. pucheranii
Richmond's squirrel, S. richmondi
Sanborn's squirrel, S. sanborni
Guayaquil squirrel, S. stramineus
Subgenus Tenes
Persian squirrel, S. anomalus
Subgenus Hadrosciurus
Fiery squirrel, S. flammifer
Junín red squirrel, S. pyrrhinus
Subgenus Hesperosciurus
Western gray squirrel, S. griseus
Subgenus Urosciurus
Northern Amazon red squirrel, S. igniventris
Southern Amazon red squirrel, S. spadiceus
Genus Syntheosciurus
Bangs's mountain squirrel, S. brochus
Genus Tamiasciurus - pine squirrels
Douglas squirrel, T. douglasii
 Southwestern red squirrel T. fremonti
American red squirrel, T. hudsonicus
Mearns's squirrel, T. mearnsi
Tribe Pteromyini – flying squirrelsSubtribe Glaucomyina
Genus EoglaucomysKashmir flying squirrel, E. fimbriatusGenus Glaucomys – New World flying squirrels
Southern flying squirrel, G. volansNorthern flying squirrel, G. sabrinusHumboldt's flying squirrel, G. oregonensisGenus HylopetesParticolored flying squirrel, H. albonigerAfghan flying squirrel, H. baberiBartel's flying squirrel, H. bartelsiGray-cheeked flying squirrel, H. lepidusPalawan flying squirrel, H. nigripesIndochinese flying squirrel, H. phayreiJentink's flying squirrel, H. platyurusSipora flying squirrel, H. siporaRed-cheeked flying squirrel, H. spadiceusSumatran flying squirrel, H. winstoniGenus IomysJavanese flying squirrel, I. horsfieldiMentawi flying squirrel, I. siporaGenus Petaurillus – pygmy flying squirrels
Lesser pygmy flying squirrel, P. emiliaeHose's pygmy flying squirrel, P. hoseiSelangor pygmy flying squirrel, P. kinlochiiGenus PetinomysBasilan flying squirrel, P. crinitusTravancore flying squirrel, P. fuscocapillusWhiskered flying squirrel, P. genibarbisHagen's flying squirrel, P. hageniSiberut flying squirrel, P. lugensMindanao flying squirrel, P. mindanensisArrow flying squirrel, P. sagittaTemminck's flying squirrel, P. setosusVordermann's flying squirrel, P. vordermanniSubtribe Pteromyina
Genus AeretesGroove-toothed flying squirrel, A. melanopterusGenus Aeromys – large black flying squirrels
Black flying squirrel, A. tephromelasThomas's flying squirrel, A. thomasiGenus BelomysHairy-footed flying squirrel, B. pearsoniiGenus BiswamoyopterusNamdapha flying squirrel, B. biswasiLaotian giant flying squirrel, B. laoensisMount Gaoligong flying squirrel, B. gaoligongensisGenus Eupetaurus Western woolly flying squirrel, Eupetaurus cinereus Yunnan woolly flying squirrel, Eupetaurus nivamons Tibetan woolly flying squirrel, Eupetaurus tibetensisGenus PetauristaRed and white giant flying squirrel, P. alborufusSpotted giant flying squirrel, P. elegansHodgson's giant flying squirrel, P. magnificusBhutan giant flying squirrel, P. nobilisIndian giant flying squirrel, P. philippensisChinese giant flying squirrel, P. xanthotisJapanese giant flying squirrel, P. leucogenysRed giant flying squirrel, P. petauristaGenus Pteromys – Old World flying squirrel
Siberian flying squirrel, P. volansJapanese dwarf flying squirrel, P. momongaGenus PteromyscusSmoky flying squirrel, P. pulverulentusGenus TrogopterusComplex-toothed flying squirrel, T. xanthipes''

References

Sciurinae
Mammal subfamilies
Extant Eocene first appearances
Taxa named by Wilhelm Hemprich